Whirligig is a 1998 novel by Paul Fleischman. It is about a teenager who builds a Whirligig in each of the corners of the United States in order to pay restitution (and to find redemption for himself) after he kills another person, by accident, in a suicide attempt by car crash.

Plot
Seventeen-year-old Brent Bishop has moved with his parents in Chicago, Illinois. he goes to a party in an attempt to fit in and become popular. He decides to talk to Brianna, a popular girl at the party. She yells at him to stop bothering her and to leave her alone. Chaz, the party host, mocks him for his actions at the party. Angered, Brent retaliates and then drives away, upset, and embarrassed. After committing social suicide, he comes to the conclusion that real suicide is the only future for him. In his own mind, he is a king, driven by depression and alcohol, crashes into a car driven by a girl named Lea Zamora. Lea dies in the crash, and Brent is left with guilt and a feeling of desperation to improve his seemingly meaningless life. Instead of a conventional prison sentence, Brent agrees to a form of restitution chosen by Lea's mother. Lea's mother tells Brent to construct and establish four whirligigs at each corner of the Contiguous United States in order to memorialize and carry on Lea's philanthropic ideals. Brent’s life beginning after the crash is shown, which serves as a wake-up call to his existence. It took a bad situation to change his perspective, and he found purpose - to share Lea’s spirit amongst people she did not know. Brent agrees to this, as he feels guilty for his actions. He receives a bus pass from Lea's family and supplies to help him build his whirligigs, hoping to find meaning in his life.

When Brent arrives at Bellevue, Washington he starts to make his first whirligig, a harpist. There, he meets a cyclist who plays Go, who teaches him about the movement of life. In San Diego, California, Brent wanted to stay at a hostel but they tell him that only foreign travelers can stay there. The clerk told him facts about Canada and let him in. He meets a foreign student named Emil at the hostel. Before leaving San Diego, he makes his second whirligig, a mermaid on top of a whale. In Miami, Florida, he ponders the concepts of religion. With the help of some children on the beach, Brent makes his penultimate whirligig, a marching band. His last whirligig was built in Weeksboro, Maine, a model of Lea Zamora which spun its arms in the wind. After that he meets a female painter who realizes Brent's problems and helps him, allowing him to finally realize he was free. He decides to place a whirligig in every state, eventually facing his parents and Lea's mother again. 

The whirligigs are left behind and impact the lives of other people that come across them long after Brent has left that area of the United States. They give hope to others, such as the supposed prayer to the wind (which is actually Lea's name written on the whirligig). They include a girl named Steph from Weeksboro who has a friend that wants to give her a boyfriend, a Puerto Rican street sweeper nicknamed Flaco in Miami looking for quiet time, a Korean boy named Anthony in Bellevue who is desperate to play baseball, and a girl named Jenny in San Diego worried about her grandmother.

Style
The novel alternates the perspective of the narration in every chapter. Among these is Brent, whose perspective takes up every other chapter starting with Chapter 1. In the other chapters, Anthony, Jenny, Flaco, and Steph are introduced. They are all profoundly affected by the whirligigs left behind by Brent, who learns the reality of life and learns not to lean toward materialistic possessions, rather, focusing on the improvement of his life, and how he can serve up to the same philanthropic qualities Lea had.

References

External links
 Whirligig – Book Review
 Whirligig – Google Books
 Publishers Weekly Review
 nataliawhirligig.weebly.com

1998 American novels
Novels by Paul Fleischman